El Monumento de la Recordación (English: Monument of Remembrance) is a memorial monument and monolith erected in San Juan, Puerto Rico that honors Puerto Ricans who have fallen in combat in service of the United States Armed Forces. The monument was unveiled on May 19, 1996 as a granite wall engraved with the names of Puerto Rican soldiers who died during combat. As of 2009, the monument was etched with the names of more than 2,000 service members.

The monument largely contains the names of soldiers who had a Puerto Rico address at their time of enlistment and/or death. If a soldier had a stateside address their name is most likely not on the monument. Because so many Puerto Ricans in the military list a United States address, their participation is underrepresented in statistics.

A sculpture by Victor Gutierrez called  (Flame of eternity) is located in the center of monument.

In 2019, attendees learned that two fallen soldiers from Puerto Rico had been recently identified as part of the Recovery of US human remains from the Korean War.

See also
 Missing in action

References

1996 establishments in Puerto Rico
Buildings and structures in San Juan, Puerto Rico
1996 sculptures
Military monuments and memorials in the United States
Monuments and memorials in Puerto Rico
Tourist attractions in San Juan, Puerto Rico